The First N. Chandrababu Naidu ministry was formed with a 11 member cabinet on 1 September 1995 headed by N. Chandrababu Naidu.

Council of Ministers

See also
 Andhra Pradesh Council of Ministers
 Third N. T. Rama Rao ministry
 Second N. Chandrababu Naidu  ministry

References

Andhra Pradesh ministries
Telugu Desam Party
1995 establishments in Andhra Pradesh
1995 in Indian politics
1999 disestablishments in India
Cabinets established in 1995
Cabinets disestablished in 1999